Albert H. McGeehan (born October 1944), was mayor of Holland, Michigan from 1993–2009. He is an Eagle Scout and was awarded the Distinguished Eagle Scout Award in 2009. He was born on Staten Island and grew up in Edison and Metuchen, NJ,  and then moved to Holland to attend Hope College and graduated in 1966. He was known as "Mayor Al". McGeehan was succeeded by Kurt Dykstra, another Republican, as mayor of Holland.

References

1944 births
Living people
Hope College alumni
People from Holland, Michigan